Sapin means "fir tree" in French. It may refer to:
 Michel Sapin (born 1952), French politician
 Sapin-sapin, a dessert in Philippine cuisine
 Sapins FC, a Gabonese football club
 The Kingdom of Sapin, a fictional country from the game Ace Combat Zero: The Belkan War
 Pointe-Sapin, New Brunswick
 Sapin II bill, France 2016, banning advertising of risky financial products such as binary options